Abell 2029 or A2029 is a large  and relaxed cluster of galaxies 315 megaparsecs (1.027 billion light-years) away in the constellation Virgo. A2029 is a Bautz–Morgan classification type I cluster due to its large central galaxy, IC 1101. Abell 2029 has a diameter of 5.8–8 million light-years. This type of galaxy is called a cD-type brightest cluster galaxy and may have grown to its large size by accreting nearby galaxies. Despite its relaxed state, it is the central member of a large supercluster which shows clear signs of interaction.

References

External links

The Scale of the Universe (Astronomy Picture of the Day 2012 March 12)

Galaxy clusters
2029
Virgo (constellation)
Abell richness class 2